Anton Silva (born October 28, 1964) is a former Sri Lankan professional footballer who played as a striker and represented Sri Lanka national football team in 1996 and 1997.

International career 
Silva included in the national team in 1996 and debuted against India and Qatar in two matches corresponding to the World Cup 1998 Qualifiers.

International goals

References

External links

1964 births
Living people
Sri Lankan footballers
Sri Lankan expatriate sportspeople in India
Sri Lanka international footballers
Renown SC players
Sri Lankan expatriate footballers
Expatriate footballers in India
Association football forwards
Sri Lanka Football Premier League players